Frontier Rangers is a 1959 film composed of 3 episodes of the TV series Northwest Passage, The Gunsmith, The Bond Women, and The Burning Village (83 mn) (1959).

The film focuses on Major Robert Rogers along with his two other Rangers who were hunting a French and Indian War Spy.

Reception
According to MGM records the movie earned $650,000 outside the US and Canada resulting in a profit of $159,000.

See also
 List of American films of 1959

References

External links

Frontier Rangers at New York Times

1959 films
Metro-Goldwyn-Mayer films
1959 drama films
American drama films
Films edited from television programs
Films scored by Raoul Kraushaar
1950s English-language films
1950s American films